New Market Historic District may refer to one of several places listed on the National Register of Historic Places:

New Market Historic District (New Market, Alabama), listed on the NRHP in Alabama
New Market Historic District (New Market, Maryland), listed on the NRHP in Maryland
New Market (Philadelphia, Pennsylvania), a National Historic Landmark in Pennsylvania
New Market Battlefield State Historical Park, site of the Battle of New Market in Virginia
New Market Historic District (New Market, Virginia), listed on the NRHP in Virginia

See also
New Market (disambiguation)